Assheton (pronounced Ashton) is an English name deriving from Ashton-under-Lyne (formerly spelt Assheton or Asheton). It may refer to:

Given name
Assheton Curzon, 1st Viscount Curzon (1730–1820), British Tory politician
Sir Assheton Curzon-Howe (1850–1911), British naval officer
Assheton Gorton (1930–2014), English production designer
Assheton Pownall (priest) (1823–1886), Archdeacon of Leicester
Sir Assheton Pownall (1877–1953), British Tory politician

Surname
Abdias Assheton (1563–1633), English clergyman
John Assheton (disambiguation), multiple people
Nicholas Assheton (1590–1625), English writer
Ralph Assheton (disambiguation), multiple people
Richard Assheton of Middleton, 16th-century soldier and landowner
Richard Assheton (died 1579), MP for Aldborough and Carlisle
R. R. G. (Rowland) Assheton, architect, designer of the Grand Picture Theatre in Adelaide, Australia (opened 1916)
Thomas Assheton Smith I (1752–1828), English landowner and all-round sportsman
Thomas Assheton Smith II (1776–1858), English landowner and all-round sportsman
William Assheton (1641–1711), English cleric

See also
Assheton baronets
Assheton-Smith baronets

English-language surnames